The PKD Foundation is a United States non-profit organization that funds research into polycystic kidney disease (PKD). It is the second-largest U.S.-based funder of PKD research after the National Institutes of Health.

Founded in 1982 by Joseph H. Bruening and Jared J. Grantham, the PKD Foundation is headquartered in Kansas City, Missouri.

References

1982 establishments in Missouri
Medical research organizations
Non-profit organizations based in Kansas City, Missouri
Organizations established in 1982
Kidney organizations